Hainan District (Mongolian:    Qayinan toɣorig) is one of three districts of the city of Wuhai, Inner Mongolia, People's Republic of China, bordering Ningxia to the southwest.

References

www.xzqh.org 

County-level divisions of Inner Mongolia